Jackie Armstrong-Homeniuk is a Canadian politician who was elected in the 2019 Alberta general election to represent the electoral district of Fort Saskatchewan-Vegreville in the 30th Alberta Legislature. She is a member the United Conservative Party and serves as the Parliamentary Secretary for Ukrainian Refugee Settlement since October 24, 2022 and previously served as the Associate Minister of Status of Women in 2022. 

Armstrong-Homeniuk serves on various standing committees, including the Families and Communities Committee, Alberta's Economic Future Committee, and the Privileges and Elections, Standing Orders and Printing Committee. Armstrong-Homeniuk introduced private member's bills Protection of Students with Life-threatening Allergies Act (Bill 201) which requires all publicly funded schools to have adrenalin autoinjectors (EpiPens) at the ready, should someone have an unexpected, life-threatening allergic reaction. Bill 201 received Royal Assent on June 28, 2019, and came into force on January 1, 2020.

A proponent for education, she is an alumni of the University of Calgary and MacEwan University. Armstrong-Homeniuk is a journeyman hairstylist, and prior to politics, she owned and operated her own salon for 34 years.

Career 
While serving as the Associate Minister of Status of Women, Armstrong-Homeniuk was on a judging panel for the essay competition "Her Vision Inspires" that partnered with the Legislative Assembly of Alberta and the Commonwealth Women Parliamentarians Canadian Region. The contest, announced in February 2022, sought to help young Albertan women discover their "political potential" by examining how they would contribute to the creation of a better society.

The winner, R. Cochrane, wrote an essay that encouraged "more young women to run for office" in response to the "imbalance in representation" within elected caucus leadership. Furthermore, this essay highlighted the importance to specifically support young women, namely between the ages of 18 to 26 in their political careers. To enable this, R Cochrane advocates for the increase in advertising campaigns to showcase programs offered within the Legislative Assembly Office to increase political involvement.

The second place winner of the competition, M. Ovcharenko, expresses the need for engaged electorate representation, where "MLA constituents feel heard and valued regardless of their MLA's political stripes." Ovcharenko emphasizes the importance of education, specifically within financial literacy, to improve the economic statehood of Alberta.

The third runner up, S. Silver presented an argument against personal greed and selfish[ness]" within Albertan society, instead promoting a "healthy appreciation for the value that young Albertan women have" to contribute to a society that "recogniz[es] children as being of the utmost importance," and not merely "an expensive burden." The essay proposed giving financial incentives to families with 2 or more children which would aid in the affordability of having a family. On August 9, 2022, Armstrong-Homeniuk came out with a statement stating that "they essay should not have been chosen."

She sent a second statement later that day apologizing after hearing public and private criticism from colleagues in the UCP caucus and cabinet, including Legislature Speaker Nathan Cooper and UCP leadership candidates and MLAs Rebecca Schulz and Rajan Sawhney.

UCP MLA Jackie Lovely confirmed she was also part of the judging panel on August 10, 2022 and apologized. Both MLAs did not explain how the essay was selected.

Electoral history

2019 general election

References

People from Vegreville
United Conservative Party MLAs
Living people
Women MLAs in Alberta
21st-century Canadian politicians
Year of birth missing (living people)
21st-century Canadian women politicians